Bothriocidaris is an extinct genus of echinoid from the Ordovician.

References
 Dinosaurs to Dodos: An Encyclopedia of Extinct Animals by Don Lessem and Jan Sovak
 Parker, Steve. Dinosaurus: the complete guide to dinosaurs. Firefly Books Inc, 2003. Pg. 55

Ordovician echinoderms
Extinct animals of North America
Extinct animals of Europe